The Battle of Custoza took place on the 24 June 1866 during the Third Italian War of Independence in the Italian unification process.

The Austrian Imperial army, joined by the Venetian Army, jointly commanded by Archduke Albrecht  of Habsburg, defeated the Italian army, led by Alfonso Ferrero La Marmora and Enrico Cialdini.

Background
In June 1866, the German Kingdom of Prussia declared war on the Austrian Empire. The recently formed Kingdom of Italy decided to seize the opportunity and allied with Prussia with the intention of annexing Venetia and thus uniting the Italian Peninsula. The Italians rapidly built up a military force that was twice the size of their Austrian counterparts defending Venetia.

Order of Battle
Austrian South Army (Field Marshal Archduke Albrecht)
V Corps (General Gabriel Freiherr von Rodich)
Moering, Piret Brigades
VII Corps (General Joseph Freiherr von Maroicic)
Scudier, Töply, Welsersheimb Brigades
IX Corps (General Ernst Ritter von Hartung)
Böck, Kirchsberg, Weckbecker Brigades
Reserve Division (General Friedrich Rupprecht)
Two weak brigades
Cavalry Division (General Ludwig Freiherr von Pulz)
Italian Mincio Army (General Alfonso Ferrero La Marmora)
I Corps (General Giovanni Durando)
1st, 2nd, 3rd and 5th Divisions
III Corps (General Enrico Morozzo Della Rocca)
7th, 8th, 9th and 16th Divisions, plus an unattached Cavalry Division

Battle
In the fourth week of May, the Italians divided their forces into two armies: the 11 division strong Army of the Mincio led by General Alfonso Ferrero La Marmora and accompanied by King Vittorio Emanuele II, and the 5 division strong Army of the Po, led by Enrico Cialdini. The Austrians, using the advantage of interior lines and the protection given by the Quadrilateral forts, concentrated against the Army of the Mincio and left a covering force against the Army of the Po.

The King's force was to move into the Trentino region, while La Marmora's crossed the Mincio River and invaded Venetia. Meanwhile, the Austrian soldiers under Archduke Albrecht of Habsburg marched west from Verona to the north of the Italians, in an attempt to move behind the Italians so as to cut them off from the rear, and thus, slaughter them. At the start of the 24 June 1866, La Marmora changed the direction of his front, toward the same heights the Austrians were trying to use as a launching point for their attack. Instead of an enveloping battle, the two forces collided head on, with both headquarters trying to discover what happened in the heights near Villafranca.

On the Austrian left, the Austrian cavalry attacked the Italian I Corps without orders at 7 AM. Although the attack was ineffectual and only crippled the Austrian cavalry, it created a panic in the Italian rear and immobilized three Italian divisions, who for the rest of the battle only took a defensive posture. During the morning isolated fights broke out in Oliosi, San Rocco, Custoza and San Giorgio between Rodic's V Corps and Durando's I Corps. After fierce fighting the division of Cerale was thrown out of Oliosi, broke, and fled to the Mincio. Sirtori's division was blocked from Monte Vento by Rodic's other troops and by 8:00am, he was thrown back by fierce bayonet attacks. By 8:30am however, gaps were opening in the Austrian line. Brignone's division had taken Belvedere Hill near Custoza after fighting with Hartung's IX Corps. By 9:00am, Hartung started launching attacks up Monte Croce, trying to dislodge Brignone, but by 10:00am the Austrians seemed spent. The Italians however neglected reinforcing Brignone. The King's younger son Amadeo led a counterattack, which failed, with the prince being severely wounded, and Brignone was ultimately forced to leave the position.

La Marmora then ordered the divisions of Cugia and Govone up the heights to relieve Brignone. This forced the Austrian brigades of Böck and Scudier out of Custoza. Scudier then retired from the field, opening another gap in the Austrian line. On the Italian left Sirtori had managed to stabilize his front after Cerale's flight. At this point in the battle, both sides were thinking they were facing a lost battle. By 1:00pm La Marmora, deciding the battle was lost and wanting to secure his bridgeheads, ordered a retreat. Unbeknownst to La Marmora, Govone's division had beaten back the VII Corps and captured Belvedere Hill. By 2 PM Rodic launched an attack on Monte Vento and Santa Lucia. When Sirtori's division gave way, a hole appeared in the Italian line, which the Austrians exploited. Govone, who thought he had finally broken through the Austrian line, suddenly found himself isolated near Custoza, with Rodic on one flank and an Austrian brigade making for the bridge at Monzambano. At this point, he was attacked in his other flank by Maroicic, who without orders had committed the two Austrian reserve brigades to the fight. At the same time Hartung's Corps was ordered to restart the fight. They drove off the division of Cugia, capturing six guns and many prisoners on the top of Monte Torre, which they had earlier failed to capture. After a bombardment by 40 Austrian guns, at 5:00pm the Italians were driven out of Custoza by Maroicic.

Aftermath
The Austrians were victorious, both strategically and tactically. The Italians were driven back across the Mincio out of Veneto. It was, however, not a decisive defeat. To inflict a decisive defeat on the Italians, Albrecht's forces needed to drive southwest to seize the bridges across the Mincio (which the Italians had neglected to fortify). Such a pursuit would have trapped the disbanded remnants of the two Italian corps on the east bank of the river and  enabled Albrecht to invade the Kingdom of Italy itself.

Instead, Albrecht did not order a pursuit because he thought the Austrians were too exhausted and the Austrian cavalry had been mauled by frivolous attacks in the morning. He thus squandered the possibility of destroying the demoralized Army of the Mincio. On the 26 June 1866, Albrecht shifted his headquarters back to Verona, because he was concerned about a possible French reply to an Austrian invasion of Lombardy. He should not have been: even the Emperor advised Albrecht to ignore all political considerations.

After their loss at Königgrätz (3 July), the Austrians were forced to transfer one corps from South Army to Austria to cover Vienna, weakening their forces in Veneto. The Italians, however, resumed their offensive only in mid-July. Cialdini crossed the Po and occupied Rovigo (11 July), Padua (12 July), Treviso (14 July), San Donà di Piave (18 July), Valdobbiadene and Oderzo (20 July), Vicenza (21 July) and finally Udine, in Friuli (22 July). In the meantime Garibaldi's volunteers had pushed forward from Brescia towards Trento (see Invasion of Trentino) fighting victoriously at the battle of Bezzecca of the 21 July.

Despite the victory at Custoza and a naval defeat of the Italians at Lissa, due to Königgrätz the Austrians were forced to surrender to the Prussians and were forced to cede Veneto.

Scenes from the Italian side of this battle were recreated for the 1954 Luchino Visconti film Senso.

See also
Quadrilatero

References

Bibliography
 
 Encyclopædia Britannica: Second Battle of Custoza
 Geoffrey Wawro, The Austro-Prussian War. Austria's war with Prussia and Italy in 1866 (New York 2007)

Further reading
Friedrich Engels.   Notes on the War in Germany No. III, The Manchester Guardian, No. 6197, June 28, 1866. A contemporary news paper article.
Clawed by the Austrian Eagle at the Battle of Custoza, Robert Heege, Warfare History Network, 14 Jan 2020

Custoza
Custoza 1866
Custoza 1866
Custoza
1866 in Italy
1866 in the Austrian Empire
June 1866 events
Custoza 1866
Orders of battle